Sprain Your Tapedeck is the first EP by American hip hop musician Edan. It was released via Lewis Recordings on October 14, 2001.

Critical reception

Matt Kallman of Pitchfork wrote, "Combining the hilarity of his Biscuithead 12-inch debut (1999's 'Sing It, Shitface') with the nostalgia of the recent Critical Beatdown-era tribute track 'Ultra 88', this record is a retardedly good time." Stanton Swihart of AllMusic called the EP "a continuation of the Edan aesthetic, part wild-style throwback and part future Dada, where old-school 808 drum loops mingle with the rapper's one-of-a-kind b-boy world view."

The Wire included it on the "2003 Rewind" list.

Track listing

References

External links
 

2001 EPs
Edan (musician) EPs